Juris Tone (born 26 May 1961 in Riga) is a Latvian-Soviet bobsledder who competed in the late 1980s. He won the bronze medal in the four-man event at the 1988 Winter Olympics in Calgary.

He is also the current recordman holder for Latvia in 4 × 100 m in Athletics (Moscow, 39.32, 1983, Spartakiads with Genadijs Murašovs, Ronalds Razmuss, Āris Āboliņš).

References

External links
 
 
 
 

1961 births
Bobsledders at the 1988 Winter Olympics
Bobsledders at the 1992 Winter Olympics
Bobsledders at the 1994 Winter Olympics
Living people
Russian male bobsledders
Soviet male bobsledders
Latvian male bobsledders
Olympic bobsledders of the Soviet Union
Olympic bobsledders of Latvia
Olympic bronze medalists for the Soviet Union
Olympic medalists in bobsleigh
Medalists at the 1988 Winter Olympics